Cardiff and Vale College abbreviated to CAVC, is a mixed-sex education Further Education college in Cardiff and the Vale of Glamorgan, Wales.

The college was formed in September 2011 by the merger of Barry College  and Coleg Glan Hafren. The merger was a result of the Welsh Assembly Government encouraging colleges in Wales to collaborate so that it could maximise benefits for students. Cardiff and Vale College (or Coleg Caerdydd a’r Fro) is now one of the largest colleges in Wales. The College took control of the Cardiff International Sports Stadium from July 2015 on a peppercorn rent to Cardiff Council.

In 2015 a new main campus costing £45 million was opened in Dumballs Road, Cardiff, to cater for 4000 students. Facilities included 130 teaching rooms, film and dance studios, a theatre, a hair salon and spa and, on the top floor, a public bar and restaurant. Having sold their main Cardiff site in City Road, Cardiff, the college intended to keep their other Cardiff campus, at Trowbridge and convert it to become an art college.

References

External links
 
 

Further education colleges in Cardiff
Further education colleges in the Vale of Glamorgan
Further education colleges in the Collab Group
University of Glamorgan
Educational institutions established in 2011
2011 establishments in Wales